Davidson High School may refer to one of the following schools:

Davidson High School (New South Wales) in Frenchs Forest, New South Wales, Australia
Davidson High School (Saskatchewan) in Davidson, Saskatchewan, Canada
Davidson High School (St. Joseph, Louisiana) in St. Joseph, Louisiana, United States
Davidson High School (Mobile, Alabama) in Mobile, Alabama
Davidson High School (Oklahoma) in Davidson, Oklahoma
Davidson High School (Croydon, UK) in Croydon, Greater London, UK, formerly Davidson Secondary Modern School

See also
 Davison High School